Hamirsar Lake is a man made lake situated in the centre of Bhuj, the headquarters of Kutch district, Gujarat, India.

History
Hamirsar lake is a 450-year-old lake named after Jadeja ruler Rao Hamir (1472-1524), the founder of Bhuj. The lake was built during the reign of Rao Khengarji I (1548–1585), the founder of Jadeja dynasty in Cutch, who named it after his father Rao Hamir. Rao Khengarji I chose this place as an oasis in saline and arid Kutch; and over several decades, developed canals and tunnels to bring together water from three river systems and recharge acquifier, to fulfill the needs of Bhuj, which was also declared as capital of his kingdom by him in 1549. 

The embankment of Lake Hamrisar was made during reign of Pragmalji II and further improvements done during early part of reign of Khengarji III under supervision of state Gaidher, Jairam Ruda Gajdhar. The embankment work was done by local mason community - the Mistris of Kutch.

Even before the earthquake of 2001 in Kutch, Hamirsar had lost much of its catchments, and ability to energize the acquifiers of Bhuj. However, after the earthquake, with a view to revive the traditional water system and to develop its catchment to meet the domestic water needs of population of Bhuj, awareness campaign mobilized the citizens, municipality, local press to do the bare minimum repairs to fill up the lake in 2003. The lake became safe and sound before the monsoons of 2003 to impound water. Highest rainfall (22 inches) in the last 50 yrs of span was recorded in 2003 which overflowed the Hamirsar lake making it an occasion to celebrate.

Puja tradition
There is a tradition from the days when Kutch was a princely state and the puja was performed by the royalty, whenever lake overflowed due to rains and a prasad of ladoos called megh laddoos distributed to citizens. Recently, in August, 2010, this historic tradition was once again en lived even though days of royalty have long gone, when the Bhuj municipal president held thanksgiving ceremony in the form of the traditional puja of the lake and offer megh laddoos to its residents at a community dinner. Records indicate that is only 18 times since independence that lake has overflowed.

Geography
The lake is spread over an area of 28 acres and have a beautiful mid-lake garden just like Kankaria Lake of Ahmedabad. The mid-lake island in center of lake, which was earlier known as Green Island but has now been renamed Rajendra Park and is maintained as a beautiful garden.

Leisure
Hamirsar Lake is where people go to swim, or sit under a tree and enjoy the water besides walking along the edge of the lake one can see Aina Mahal, Prag Mahal, Kutch Museum, Alfred High School and many temples, which are located on eastern edge of the lake.

References

Lakes of Gujarat
Geography of Kutch district
Bhuj
Tourist attractions in Kutch district
Water Heritage Sites in India